Yemane Gebreab (born 1954 in Eritrea) is the Head of Political Affairs and Presidential Adviser. He is also a member of the People's Front for Democracy and Justice (PFDJ), the sole and ruling political party of Eritrea. 

Yemane graduated with a bachelor’s degree from the University of Washington in Seattle.

Yemane Gebreab has been Special Advsior to the President of Eritrea and Senior Diplomat. He has been on diplomatic meetings in Egypt, Iran, Venezuela, China, Sudan, Russia, and Ethiopia. He also plays a pivotal role at the United Nations in New York. Yemane Gebreab has been in charge of policy development for Sudanese Politics.

Yemane Gebreab is currently under U.S. Government sanctions.

References 

Living people
People's Front for Democracy and Justice politicians
1954 births